= North American Soccer League (disambiguation) =

The North American Soccer League may refer to:

- North American Soccer League (1968–1984), a former Division I league
- North American Soccer League (2011–2017), a former Division II league
